The 1926–27 season was Galatasaray SK's 23rd in existence and the club's 17th consecutive season in the Istanbul Football League.

Squad statistics

Squad changes for the 1926–27 season
In:

Competitions

İstanbul Football League

Standings

Matches
Kick-off listed in local time (EEST)

Friendly matches
Kick-off listed in local time (EEST)

References

 Futbol, Galatasaray. Tercüman Spor Ansiklopedisi vol.2 (1981) page (561)
 1926–1927 İstanbul Futbol Ligi. Türk Futbol Tarihi vol.1. page(46–47). (June 1992) Türkiye Futbol Federasyonu Yayınları. 
 Tuncay, Bülent (2002). Galatasaray Tarihi. Page (118) Yapı Kredi Yayınları 
 Tekil, Süleyman. Dünden bugüne Galatasaray(1983). Page(174–175). Arset Matbaacılık Kol.Şti.

External links
 Galatasaray Sports Club Official Website 
 Turkish Football Federation – Galatasaray A.Ş. 
 uefa.com – Galatasaray AŞ

Galatasaray S.K. (football) seasons
Turkish football clubs 1926–27 season
1920s in Istanbul